Palikanci, abbreviation from Palimanan–Kanci Toll Road is a toll road located in the city of Cirebon, West Java in Indonesia. This toll road has been operating since 1998. Palikanci Toll Road is operated by PT Jasa Marga Tbk.

Exits

Note: The number on the exits is based on the distance from the western terminus of the Jakarta-Cikampek Toll Road, while the distance numbers are based on the distance from the western terminus of this toll road only

See also
 Transport in Indonesia

References

External links
PT Jasa Marga website

Toll roads in Java
Transport in West Java
Cirebon
Cirebon Regency